Limestone Township is one of seventeen townships in Kankakee County, Illinois, USA.  As of the 2010 census, its population was 5,035 and it contained 1,928 housing units.  Limestone Township is one of the six original townships in the county.

Geography

Cities, towns, villages
 Kankakee (west edge)
 Limestone

Unincorporated towns
 Greenwich at 
 Hillside Manor at 
(This list is based on USGS data and may include former settlements.)

Adjacent townships
 Rockville Township (north)
 Bourbonnais Township (northeast)
 Kankakee Township (east)
 Otto Township (southeast)
 Pilot Township (southwest)
 Salina Township (west)
 Custer Township, Will County (northwest)

Cemeteries
The township contains these two cemeteries: Limestone and Schreffler.

Major highways
  Illinois Route 17

Airports and landing strips
 Kankakee Airport

Landmarks
 Kankakee River State Park (vast majority)

Demographics

Government
The township is governed by an elected Town Board of a Supervisor and four Trustees.  The Township also has an elected Assessor, Clerk, Highway Commissioner and Supervisor.  The Township Office is located at 5030 West Route 17, Kankakee, IL 60901.

Political districts
 Illinois' 11th congressional district
 State House District 75
 State Senate District 38

School districts
 Herscher Community Unit School District 2

References
 
 United States Census Bureau 2007 TIGER/Line Shapefiles
 United States National Atlas

External links
 Kankakee County Official Site
 City-Data.com
 Illinois State Archives

Townships in Kankakee County, Illinois
Populated places established in 1853
Townships in Illinois